The Vadodara bus station or Vadodara Central Bus Terminal is the central bus station serving Vadodara city in Gujarat, India.

History
The bus station was built under a public-private partnership between the Gujarat State Road Transport Corporation (GSRTC) and realty firm Cube Construction. The building is known as the Ved Transcube Plaza. The station handles over 800 buses and as many as 28,000 to 35,000 passengers daily. The commercial complex of the station building has 400 retail shops of an average 250 to 350 square feet each, a flea market, a food court with 22 outlets, a seven-screen multiplex run by PVR Cinemas and a 100-room budget hotel.

The design of exterior takes inspiration from the banyan tree which is associated with the name of the city.

It was inaugurated by then Gujarat Chief Minister Narendra Modi on 15 February 2014.

References

Bus stations in India
Transport in Vadodara
Buildings and structures in Vadodara